Kay Schulle is an American bridge player.

Bridge accomplishments

Wins

 Venice Cup (1) 1993 
 North American Bridge Championships (7)
 Machlin Women's Swiss Teams (2) 1991, 1993 
 Sternberg Women's Board-a-Match Teams (2) 1991, 2005 
 Wagar Women's Knockout Teams (2) 1985, 1989 
 Whitehead Women's Pairs (1) 1987

Runners-up

 North American Bridge Championships (7)
 Jacoby Open Swiss Teams (1) 2001 
 Machlin Women's Swiss Teams (2) 1988, 1995 
 Rockwell Mixed Pairs (1) 1994 
 Wagar Women's Knockout Teams (2) 1990, 1993 
 von Zedtwitz Life Master Pairs (1) 1990

Discipline for Cheating, 2020
Schulle and playing partner Gerald Sosler were found guilty of cheating by the American Contract Bridge League (ACBL) Online Ethical Oversight Committee in August 2020 for "failing to disclose partnership agreements with intent to deceive..." They were suspended for six months, put on probation for a further six months and forfeited masterpoints won during three events on Bridge Base Online (BBO).

References

American contract bridge players
Venice Cup players